Lieutenant-General Patrick J. "Paddy" O'Donnell  (July 12, 1940 – September 24, 2015) was a Canadian Forces officer. He was Vice Chief of the Defence Staff in Canada.

Military career
Educated at Queen's University, O'Donnell joined the Royal Canadian Air Force in 1959 and pursued a flying career. He became Commander of Canada's Northern Region in 1987, Deputy Commander of Air Command in 1990 and Assistant Deputy Minister (Personnel) at the National Defence Headquarters in 1992. His last appointment was as Vice Chief of the Defence Staff in 1993 before retiring in 1995.

In retirement he became Director of Business Planning at Spar Aerospace. On September 24, 2015, O'Donnell died at the age of 75.

References

1940 births
2015 deaths
Canadian generals
Commanders of the Order of Military Merit (Canada)
Military personnel from Toronto
Queen's University at Kingston alumni
Vice Chiefs of the Defence Staff (Canada)